In mathematics, the Arens–Fort space is a special example in the theory of topological spaces, named for Richard Friederich Arens and M. K. Fort, Jr.

Definition 
The Arens–Fort space is the topological space  where  is the set of ordered pairs of non-negative integers  A subset  is open, that is, belongs to  if and only if:
  does not contain  or
  contains  and also all but a finite number of points of all but a finite number of columns, where a column is a set  with  fixed. 

In other words, an open set is only "allowed" to contain  if only a finite number of its columns contain significant gaps, where a gap in a column is significant if it omits an infinite number of points.

Properties 

It is 
 Hausdorff
 regular
 normal

It is not:
 second-countable
 first-countable
 metrizable
 compact

There is no sequence in  that converges to  However, there is a sequence  in  such that  is a cluster point of

See also

References 

 

Topological spaces